The 1975 German Formula Three Championship was a multi-event motor racing championship for single-seat open wheel formula racing cars held across Europe. The championship featured drivers competing in two-litre Formula Three racing cars which conformed to the technical regulations, or formula, for the championship. It commenced on 31 March at Nürburgring and ended at Hockenheimring on 30 November after thirteen rounds.

Jägermeister Racing Team  driver Ernst Maring became a champion. He won five races. Bertram Schäfer finished as runner-up, winning the race Sembach, Hockenheim and Ulm-Mengen. Gunnar Nordström completed the top-three in the drivers' standings with a win at Nürburgring. Rudolf Dötsch, Freddy Kottulinsky and Marc Surer were the only other drivers who were able to win a race in the season.

Calendar
All rounds were held in West Germany.

Championship standings
Points are awarded as follows:

References

External links
 

German Formula Three Championship seasons
Formula Three season